Cyrtodactylus kingsadai is a species of gecko, a lizard in the family Gekkonidae. The species is endemic to Vietnam.

Etymology
The specific name, kingsadai, is in honor of Laotian herpetologist Phouthone Kingsada (died 2012).

Geographic range
C. kingsadai is found in southern Vietnam, in Phu Yen Province.

Habitat

Description

Reproduction
The mode of reproduction of C. kingsadai is unknown.

References

Further reading
Ziegler T, Phung TM, Le MD, Nguyen TQ (2013). "A new Cyrtodactylus (Squamata: Gekkonidae) from Phu Yen Province, southern Vietnam". Zootaxa 3686 (4): 432–446. (Cyrtodactylus kingsadai, new species).

Cyrtodactylus
Reptiles described in 2013